Matthew Jeffery Horne (born 5 December 1970) is a former New Zealand cricketer who played in 35 Tests and 50 ODIs from 1997 to 2003. Horne was an attacking right-handed opening batsman who possessed an unusually high backlift.

Early life and family
Horne was born in Takapuna on 5 December 1970, the son of Noelene Rae Horne (née Swinton), who represented New Zealand in the high jump, and Valentine Arthur Horne. His older brother Phil also played international cricket for New Zealand.

Domestic career
In the 1995–96 Shell Trophy final he made 190 to hand Auckland the championship. The following season he moved to Otago and after a prolific season he was welcomed into the New Zealand side.

During the 2003–04 he and Aaron Barnes added a record 347* for the fifth wicket against Northern Districts at Eden Park.

International career
He made his Test debut in February 1997 and made his maiden Test hundred soon after, against Australia at Hobart in summer of 1997–98. He made 3 more hundreds in his international career, two against Zimbabwe and a vital one at Lord's in 1999 to help give them a rare away series win. After nine Tests without a half century he lost his place in the side and only played occasionally from there on in.

Horne, along with Nathan Astle, currently holds the record for a 4th wicket partnership for New Zealand totalling 243 runs against Zimbabwe in Auckland during the 1997–1998 season.

After cricket
He retired from all forms of competitive cricket in May 2006. He is currently a high performance coach with Auckland cricket.

References

External links
 

1970 births
Living people
New Zealand Test cricketers
New Zealand One Day International cricketers
New Zealand cricketers
Auckland cricketers
Otago cricketers
Cricketers at the 1998 Commonwealth Games
Cricketers at the 1999 Cricket World Cup
Commonwealth Games bronze medallists for New Zealand
New Zealand cricket coaches
Commonwealth Games medallists in cricket
Cricketers from Auckland
People from Takapuna
Medallists at the 1998 Commonwealth Games